Conus pomareae is a species of sea snail, a marine gastropod mollusc in the family Conidae, the cone snails, cone shells or cones.

These snails are predatory and venomous. They are capable of "stinging" humans.

Description
The length of the shell attains 24.7 mm.

Distribution
This marine species occurs in the Pacific Ocean off the Society Islands .

References

 Eric Monnier & Loïc Limpalaër, A new endemic species from French Polynesia : Leporiconus pomareae n. sp. (Gastropoda, Conidae); Xenophora Taxonomy N° 5 - Supplément au Xenophora n° 148 - Octobre 2014
 Filmer R.M. (2001). A Catalogue of Nomenclature and Taxonomy in the Living Conidae 1758 - 1998. Backhuys Publishers, Leiden. 388pp.

External links
 To World Register of Marine Species

pomareae
Gastropods described in 2014